En las buenas y en las malas may refer to:

 En las Buenas... y en las Malas, 1990 album by Mexican singer José José 
 En las buenas y en las malas (film), 2019 Mexican film